Battle for Normandy is a 1982 video game published by Strategic Simulations.

Gameplay
Battle for Normandy is a game in which the operations from the landing at Normandy up through the build-up that led to Operation Cobra is simulated.

Reception
Computer Gaming World reviewed the game and stated that "Overall, Battle for Normandy is an enjoyable game that will allow multiple playings and repeated playings with equal satisfaction."

Reviews
Zzap! - May, 1985
Computer Gaming World - Nov, 1991
Computer Gaming World - Dec, 1991
 Casus Belli #16 (Aug 1983)

References

External links
Review in Computers & Electronics
Review in Softalk
Review in Family Computing
Article in Micro Adventurer
Review in Your 64
Review in Electronic Games
Article in Video Games & Computer Entertainment

1982 video games
Apple II games
Atari 8-bit family games
Commodore 64 games
Computer wargames
DOS games
Strategic Simulations games
TRS-80 games
Turn-based strategy video games
Video games developed in the United States
Video games set in France
Works about Operation Overlord
World War II video games